The 2023 EuroLeague Final Four will be the concluding EuroLeague Final Four tournament of the 2022–23 EuroLeague season, the 66th season of Europe's premier club basketball tournament, and the 23rd season since it was first organised by Euroleague Basketball. It will the 36th Final Four of the modern EuroLeague Final Four era (1988–present), and the 38th time overall that the competition has concluded with a final four format.

Venue
On 19 December 2022 it was announced that the Final Four will be played at the Žalgiris Arena in Kaunas, Lithuania, on 19–21 May 2023.

References

External links
Official website

Final
Basketball in Kaunas
EuroLeague Finals
International basketball competitions hosted by Lithuania
Sports competitions in Kaunas
2020s in Kaunas
EuroLeague
EuroLeague
EuroLeague